Sergey Aleksandrovich Samodin (born 14 February 1985) is a Russian former footballer who played as a striker.

Club career
He made his debut for PFC CSKA Moscow on 8 March 2003 in a 2003 Russian Super Cup game against FC Lokomotiv Moscow and scored his shot in the penalty shoot-out as CSKA lost. He made his Russian Premier League debut for CSKA on 19 April 2003 against FC Rostov.

Samodin played for CSKA Moscow until 2005, and then FC Spartak Nizhny Novgorod in 2006 scoring 20 goals in 40 games, before moving to Dnipro. He made his debut for Dnipro on 3 March 2007 in a 1–1 draw with FC Illychivets Mariupol.

In January 2014, Samodin signed a 2.5-year contract with Mordovia Saransk.

International career
Samodin played for the Russian Under 21 team.

Career statistics

Notes

External links
 Profile at FC Dnipro site

References

1985 births
Sportspeople from Stavropol
Living people
Russian footballers
Russia under-21 international footballers
Russian expatriate footballers
Association football forwards
Expatriate footballers in Ukraine
PFC CSKA Moscow players
UEFA Cup winning players
FC Dnipro players
FC Kryvbas Kryvyi Rih players
FC Arsenal Kyiv players
FC Chornomorets Odesa players
FC Mordovia Saransk players
FC Shinnik Yaroslavl players
FC Tom Tomsk players
FC Yenisey Krasnoyarsk players
Russian Premier League players
Ukrainian Premier League players
Russian expatriate sportspeople in Ukraine
PFC Krylia Sovetov Samara players
FC Spartak Nizhny Novgorod players